Bryan Desmond Hughes MC (1888 – 6 August 1918) was an Australian soldier and international rugby union player.  He was one of a number of Australian rugby internationals who were killed during the First World War.

Early life

Bryan Hughes was born in Sydney, the son of the Hon. John Francis Hughes and his wife, Mary Rose Gilhooley. His elder brother James was also an Australian rugby union representative player. He attended Saint Ignatius' College, Riverview. Playing as a flanker, Hughes claimed two international rugby caps for Australia.

Military service
Placed into action during World War I as a second lieutenant with the 8th Battalion, 48th Brigade of the 16th (Irish) Division, and with the 1st Battalion, Royal Dublin Fusiliers, Hughes was awarded the Military Cross. He was killed on 6 August 1918, and is buried at the British Cemetery in Borre, Nord, France (Grave II. G. 2).

International appearances

See also
 List of international rugby union players killed in action during the First World War

References

External links
 
 Bryan Hughes on militarian.com

1888 births
1918 deaths
Australian rugby union players
Australia international rugby union players
Australian military personnel killed in World War I
Date of birth missing
Rugby union players from Sydney
Recipients of the Military Cross
Rugby union flankers